All Fowled Up is a 1955 Warner Bros. Looney Tunes animated short film directed by Robert McKimson. The cartoon was released on February 19, 1955, and features Foghorn Leghorn, Henery Hawk and the Barnyard Dawg.

Plot
Foghorn Leghorn as usual sneaks up on the Barnyard Dawg and hits his rear with a 2x4 and when the chase begins, Foghorn leads Dawg over a well, which Dawg -when his rope reaches its limit- falls into, taking his kennel with him. After Dawg bails all the water out following this, he sneaks up on Foghorn and attacks him while the rooster is asleep. Foghorn, believing that Dawg is "lower than a snake full of buckshot", remarks that he could pay a visit to him and "gently break him in two with my good right arm!" when his arm muscles turn slack. He resolves to do some exercises to build them up.

While he is doing push-ups however he sees a chicken with unusually short legs passing by. When he picks up the chicken, he uncovers Henery Hawk who then tries to take Foghorn. In response, Foghorn sends Henery on a wild ride on a plate. It flies over to the Dawg's kennel who, panicked by the sight of "A flying saucer! Little man from Mars!", hides in and barricades his kennel. Henery ends up flying through a hole in the back of the kennel, causing Dawg to burst through its roof.

He picks the chicken hawk up and Henery explains that Foghorn is responsible. When Dawg informs Henery that Foghorn is a chicken as they see the rooster doing pull-ups, Dawg convinces him to put Foghorn in a cooking pot and cook him. When Henery does so, the heat from the fire causes Foghorn to rocket out in pain and crash-land into some trash where the rooster quickly figures out Dawg was responsible for what had just happened ("I ju..., I say, I just know that marble-headed mongrel is back of all this.").

Foghorn's next pranks after that end up backfiring on him. When he constructs an elaborate pipeline to blow a stick of dynamite out of Dawg's kennel with the intention of blowing him up, while he tries to light a lighter to ignite the dynamite ("this is gonna cause more confusion than a mouse at a burlesque show"), Dawg lights a match from his side and blows it over to Foghorn where it ignites the fuse on the dynamite just as he lights his lighter. The feathers of Foghorn's upper half come out from the end of the pipe on Dawg's side after the explosion. Foghorn is quick to pick his plumage up, saying "Fortunately, I keep my feathers numbered for... for just such an emergency."

Later on, Foghorn takes a sleeping Dawg and his kennel with an intention to entomb both in concrete from a cement truck. The rooster pours out a small fraction of concrete from the mixer to place the kennel on as a precaution in case Dawg tries to escape. However, when Foghorn tries to pour the whole load of concrete onto it, a ramp comes out from the mixer and the whole load flows onto Foghorn instead. Foghorn can do nothing as the concrete hardens, leaving him in a Thinker-like pose. Dawg asks him, "Well, smarty-pants, what ya gonna do now?", to which Foghorn replies "Don't, I say, don't bother me, dawg. Can't ya see I'm thinkin?" Henery Hawk reappears and drags a tough-to-chew dinner home with him, delivering the final punchline, "Of all the kinds of chickens in the world, I had to catch me a Plymouth Rock!"

References

External links

1955 animated films
1955 short films
1955 films
Looney Tunes shorts
Warner Bros. Cartoons animated short films
Films directed by Robert McKimson
1950s Warner Bros. animated short films
Films scored by Carl Stalling
1950s English-language films
Foghorn Leghorn films
Henery Hawk films
Barnyard Dawg films